The  is a partially tolled two-lane national expressway in Iwate Prefecture, Japan. The expressway connects Kamaishi, Iwate on the prefecture's Pacific coast to the Tōhoku Expressway. It is owned and operated by partly by the East Nippon Expressway Company and the Ministry of Land, Infrastructure, Transport and Tourism. The expressway is signed as an auxiliary route of National Route 283 as well as E46 under the "2016 Proposal for Realization of Expressway Numbering."

Route description
From Hanamaki to Tōwa the expressway is maintained and tolled by the East Nippon Expressway Company. The rest of the expressway is able to be driven without any fees. That section of the expressway is maintained by the Tōhoku branch of the Ministry of Land, Infrastructure, Transport and Tourism.

The entire expressway has only one lane in each direction, with passing lanes at some interchanges. The speed limit is 70 km/h for the entire route, except for the section between Tōno and Miyamori.

History
The Kamaishi Expressway was first opened in 2002. There was a 10 kilometer gap in the expressway in Tōno and the expressway did not connect to its eastern terminus at a junction with the Sanriku Expressway. These missing links in the expressway were scheduled to be completed in 2018, but were instead opened later in March 2019.

Junction list
The entire expressway is in Iwate Prefecture.

See also
Japan National Route 46

References

External links

 East Nippon Expressway Company

Expressways in Japan
Roads in Iwate Prefecture